Raúl López del Castillo (1893 in Cuba – 24 July 1963 in Miami, Florida USA) was a Cuban lawyer and government official.

Lopez was the Prime Minister of Cuba from 1946 to 1948 during the presidency of Ramon Grau.  Previously he served as Under-Secretary of the Treasury (1944–1946). He was a member of the Cuban Revolutianary Party (Partido Auténtico).

He wrote several law books in both English and Spanish. He was married to Sofia de la Hoya.  They had two children: Sophie and Raul Jr.

References

  (Spanish)

Prime Ministers of Cuba
1893 births
1963 deaths
Partido Auténtico politicians
1940s in Cuba
20th-century Cuban lawyers
20th-century Cuban politicians
Cuban emigrants to the United States